The Nastro d'Argento (Silver Ribbon) is a film award assigned each year, since 1946, by Sindacato Nazionale dei Giornalisti Cinematografici Italiani ("Italian National Syndicate of Film Journalists"), the association of Italian film critics.

This is the list of Nastro d'Argento awards for Best Score. Ennio Morricone is the record holder with nine Nastro d'Argento awards for Best Score received from 1965 to 2013.

1940s 
1947 - Renzo Rossellini - Paisan
1948 - Renzo Rossellini - The Brothers Karamazov
1949 - Alessandro Cicognini - Bicycle Thieves

1950s 
1950 - Roman Vlad - for all his works
1951 - Giovanni Fusco - Story of a Love Affair
1952 - Mario Nascimbene - Rome 11:00
1953 - Valentino Bucchi - Eager to Live
1954 - Mario Zafred - Chronicle of Poor Lovers
1955 - Angelo Francesco Lavagnino - Lost Continent
1956 - Angelo Francesco Lavagnino - Vertigine bianca
1957 - Nino Rota - War and Peace
1958 - Nino Rota - White Nights
1959 - Carlo Rustichelli - A Man of Straw

1960s 
1960 - Mario Nascimbene - Estate Violenta
1961 - Giovanni Fusco - L'Avventura
1962 - Giorgio Gaslini - La Notte
1963 - Piero Piccioni - Salvatore Giuliano
1964 - Nino Rota - 8½
1965 - Ennio Morricone - A Fistful of Dollars
1966 - Armando Trovajoli - Sette uomini d'oro
1967 - Carlo Rustichelli - L'armata Brancaleone
1968 - Mario Nascimbene - Pronto... c'è una certa Giuliana per te
1969 - Nino Rota - Romeo and Juliet

1970s 
1970 - Ennio Morricone - Metti una sera a cena
1971 - Stelvio Cipriani - The Anonymous Venetian
1972 - Ennio Morricone - Sacco e Vanzetti
1973 - Guido De Angelis, Maurizio De Angelis - All the Way, Boys
1974 - Tony Renis - Brothers Blue
1975 - Giancarlo Chiaramello - Orlando Furioso
1976 - Adriano Celentano - Yuppi du
1977 - Fred Bongusto - Oh, Serafina!
1978 - Armando Trovajoli - A Special Day
1979 - Nino Rota - Orchestra Rehearsal

1980s 
1980 - Fred Bongusto - La Cicala
1981 - Riz Ortolani - Aiutami a sognare
1982 - Lucio Dalla, Fabio Liberatori  - Talcum Powder
1983 - Angelo Branduardi - State buoni... se potete
1984 - Riz Ortolani - Una gita scolastica
1985 - Ennio Morricone - Once Upon a Time in America
1986 - Tony Esposito - Camorra (A Story of Streets, Women and Crime)
1987
Armando Trovajoli - The Family
Riz Ortolani - The Inquiry
Giovanni Nuti - Stregati
1988 - Ennio Morricone - The Untouchables
1989 - Eugenio Bennato, Carlo D'Angiò - Cavalli si nasce

1990s 
1990 - Claudio Mattone - Scugnizzi
1991 - Nicola Piovani - The Voice of the Moon, In nome del popolo sovrano, Il male oscuro, The Sun Also Shines at Night 
1992 - Pino Daniele - Pensavo fosse amore invece era un calesse
1993 - Manuel De Sica - Al lupo al lupo
1994 - Federico De Robertis - Sud
1995 - Luis Enríquez Bacalov - Il Postino: The Postman
1996 - Lucio Dalla - Beyond the Clouds
1997 - Paolo Conte - La freccia azzurra
1998 - Nino D'Angelo - Tano da morire
1999 - Eugenio Bennato - La stanza dello scirocco

2000s 
2000 - Ennio Morricone - Canone inverso
2001 - Ennio Morricone - Malèna
2002 - Edoardo Bennato - Il principe e il pirata
2003 - Nicola Piovani - Pinocchio
2004 - Paolo Fresu - L'isola
2005 - Banda Osiris - First Love
2006 - Negramaro, Roy Paci, Fabio Barovero, Simone Fabbroni, Louis Siciliano - La febbre
2007 - Ennio Morricone - The Unknown Woman
2008 - Paolo Buonvino - Quiet Chaos
2009 - Paolo Buonvino - Italians

2010s 
2010 - Rita Marcotulli - Basilicata coast to coast
2011 - Negramaro - Vallanzasca – Gli angeli del male
2012 - Franco Piersanti - Terraferma, The First Man
2013 - Ennio Morricone - The Best Offer
2014 - Pivio and Aldo De Scalzi - Song'e Napule
2015 - Nicola Piovani - Hungry Hearts
2016 - Carlo Virzì - Like Crazy

See also 
 David di Donatello for Best Score
 Cinema of Italy

References

External links 
 Italian National Syndicate of Film Journalists official site  

Nastro d'Argento
Film awards for best score